Shahu may refer to:
 Shahu I, Maratha king
 Shahu II of Satara, Maratha king
 Shahu of Kolhapur (1874-1922), Raja and Maharaja of Indian princely state of Kolhapur
 Shahu II of Kolhapur (born 1948), ceremonial Maharaja of Kolhapur
 Shahu District, an administrative subdivision of Iran
 Shahu Rural District, an administrative subdivision of Iran
 Shaho, a mountain located in Hewraman, Kurdistan, Iran
 Shahu (Sand Lake), a lake (surrounded by Wuchang District) in Hongshan District, Wuhan, Hubei, China
 Shahu, Longganhu Administrative District in Longganhu Administrative District, Huanggang, Hubei, China